Albert Friling (born 25 February 1879, date of death unknown) was a Belgian footballer. He played in two matches for the Belgium national football team from 1904 to 1909.

References

External links
 

1879 births
Year of death missing
Belgian footballers
Belgium international footballers
Place of birth missing
Association football defenders